Kundoor is a village in Nannambra Grama Panchayath in Malappuram district state of Kerala, India. The village is situated close to the town of Tirurangadi, about 3 km away from Venniyour, National Highway 17.

Places 
Kundoor North (Chethey) 
Kundoor Athani
kundoor Kallathadakki
Kundoor Jayaram Padi
Kundoor Moolakkal
Kundoor Usthad Maqam, the grave of Sheikh Abdul Khadir Musliyar Kundoor. Kundoor Uroos is the annual festival based in the grave.
Chakkappathayam
Kundoor thoorpil masjid magfira
Kundoor marakkappadam

Notable person

 Sheikh Abdul Khadir Musliyar, Kundoor
K Ayamu Sahib
Kunjhali Haji MC
Kunjhimarakar

Transportation
The nearest airport is at Kozhikode.  The nearest major railway station is at Parappanangadi.

References

Villages in Malappuram district
Parappanangadi area